Michael Ted Evans (born September 16, 1975) is an American politician. He is a member of the Mississippi House of Representatives from the 45th District, being first elected in 2011 as a member of the Democratic party.

He lost to Michael Guest.

In January 2020, he left the Democratic Party and became an Independent.

References

21st-century American politicians
1975 births
Living people
Members of the Mississippi House of Representatives
Mississippi Democrats
Mississippi Independents
People from Kemper County, Mississippi
Candidates in the 2018 United States elections